Daniel Reed Cabrera (born September 5, 1998) is an American professional baseball outfielder in the Detroit Tigers organization.

Amateur career
Cabrera attended John Curtis Christian High School for his first three years of high school. He committed to play college baseball at Louisiana State University during his junior season in 2016. During his junior season, he batted .393 with three home runs while pitching to a 1.22 earned run average. He transferred to Parkview Baptist High School for his senior year in 2017, where he batted .510. Following the season, he was selected by the San Diego Padres in the 26th round of the 2017 Major League Baseball draft. However, he did not sign, and instead chose to honor his commitment to LSU.

As a freshman in 2018, Cabrera was immediately thrust into the starting lineup. Over 63 games (58 starts), he batted .315 with eight home runs and 54 runs batted in (RBIs), earning various All-American honors alongside a spot on the SEC All-Freshman Team. He spent that summer playing for the USA Baseball Collegiate National Team and also played for the Bourne Braves of the Cape Cod Baseball League (CCBL). In 2019, his sophomore season, he slashed .284/.359/.516 with 12 home runs and 50 RBIs. That summer, he returned to the CCBL to play for the Harwich Mariners, earning All-Star honors. Cabrera entered his junior year in 2020 as a top prospect for the 2020 Major League Baseball draft. He appeared in 17 games, batting .345 with two home runs, before the college baseball season was cut short due to the COVID-19 pandemic.

Professional career
Cabrera was selected by the Detroit Tigers with the 62nd overall pick in the draft, and signed for $1.2 million. He did not play a minor league game in 2020 due to the cancellation of the minor league season caused by the pandemic. To begin the 2021 season, he was assigned to the West Michigan Whitecaps of the High-A Central. After slashing .242/.300/.395 with nine home runs and 64 RBIs over 99 games, he was promoted to the Erie SeaWolves of the Double-A Northeast in late August. Over 17 games with Erie, Cabrera batted .174 with four home runs and nine RBIs. He returned to Erie to begin the 2022 season, was reassigned to West Michigan in early June, and then returned to Erie once again in early July. Over 120 games between the two teams, he slashed .237/.309/.351 with eight home runs and 46 RBIs.

References

External links

LSU Tigers bio

1998 births
Living people
Baseball players from Louisiana
Baseball outfielders
Bourne Braves players
Harwich Mariners players
United States national baseball team players
LSU Tigers baseball players
West Michigan Whitecaps players
Erie SeaWolves players